Kleptomania is the inability to refrain from the urge for stealing. 

Kleptomania may also refer to:

 Kleptomania (album), a 2004 album by Mansun
 Kleptomania (band), a 1970s Belgian rock band that included Dany Lademacher
 Kleptomania, a boutique at Carnaby Street, London in the 1960s

See also
 Klepto (2003 film)